Feasterville is a census-designated place located in Bucks County, Pennsylvania, United States. The community was part of Feasterville-Trevose, which was split into two separate CDPs, the other being Trevose. As of the 2010 census, the population was 3,074. Feasterville has grown by 2.02% since 2006.

Demographics

As of 2014, Feasterville had a population of 3,656. 94.47% of the population were White, 4.68% were Hispanic or Latino, 3.06% Black or African American, and 2.46% Asian. 17.94% of the population were foreign born, including a large Russian population.

Education
Lower Southampton Township lies within the Neshaminy School District. Public school students within township boundaries may attend Joseph Ferderbar Elementary School or Tawanka Elementary School for grades K-4, depending on where they live. Poquessing Middle School serves students in grades 5-8, and Neshaminy High School serves students in grades 9-12.

St. Katharine Drexel Regional Catholic School in Holland is the local Catholic grade school. In 2012  Assumption B.V.M. Catholic School in Feasterville merged with St. Bede the Venerable School in Holland to form St. Katharine Drexel.

Climate

According to the Köppen climate classification system, Feasterville has a Hot-summer Humid continental climate (Dfa). Dfa climates are characterized by at least one month having an average mean temperature ≤ , at least four months with an average mean temperature ≥ , at least one month with an average mean temperature ≥  and no significant precipitation difference between seasons. Although most summer days are slightly humid in Feasterville, episodes of heat and high humidity can occur with heat index values > . The average wettest month is July which correlates with the peak in thunderstorm activity. Episodes of extreme cold and wind can occur with wind chill values < . Ice storms and large snowstorms depositing ≥ 12 inches (30 cm) occur once every few years, particularly during nor’easters from December through February.

Ecology

According to the A. W. Kuchler U.S. potential natural vegetation types, Feasterville would have a dominant vegetation type of Appalachian Oak (104) with a dominant vegetation form of Eastern Hardwood Forest (25). The average date of first spring leaf-out is March 25 and fall color usually peaks in late-October and early-November.

Notes

Census-designated places in Bucks County, Pennsylvania
Census-designated places in Pennsylvania